The 2004–05 Rugby Pro D2 season was the 2004–05 second division of French club rugby union. There is promotion and relegation in Pro Rugby D2, and after the 2004–05 season, Toulon finished at the top of the table and were promoted to the top level, and Limoges and CA Périgueux were relegated to third division.

Standings

See also
 Rugby union in France

External links
 LNR.fr
 Table

2004–05
Pro D2